Got the Beat (stylized as GOT the beat) is a South Korean supergroup formed by SM Entertainment in 2022. It is the first sub-unit of project group Girls On Top, and consists of seven members: soloist BoA, Taeyeon and Hyoyeon from Girls' Generation, Seulgi and Wendy from Red Velvet, and Karina and Winter from Aespa.

History

Background
All members of Got the Beat are part of SM Entertainment's recording artists lineup. BoA had been an active artist since the age of 13, when she debuted as a soloist in 2000. Taeyeon and Hyoyeon debuted as members of Girls' Generation in 2007, and as members of Girls' Generation's second sub-unit Oh!GG in 2018. Taeyeon is also a member of Girls' Generation's first sub-unit Girls' Generation-TTS since 2012. Taeyeon and Hyoyeon have been soloists since 2015 and 2016, respectively. Seulgi and Wendy debuted as members of Red Velvet in 2014. Seulgi is a member of Red Velvet's sub-unit Red Velvet – Irene & Seulgi since 2020, while Wendy and Seulgi debuted as a soloist in 2021 and 2022, respectively. Karina and Winter debuted as members of Aespa in 2020.

2021–present: Formation, debut with "Step Back", and Stamp On It
SM Entertainment announced the launch of the project group Girls On Top and its first sub-unit Got the Beat on December 27, 2021, with Got the Beat focusing on intense dance songs and performances. On December 28, 2021, it was announced that the group's debut single "Step Back" would be released on January 3, 2022. The song peaked at number 4 on the Gaon Digital Chart and at number 5 on the Billboard World Digital Songs Chart. The group unveiled their first "Step Back" performance stage at the SM Town Live 2022: SMCU Express at Kwangya on January 1, before making their official broadcast debut on music program M Countdown almost a month later. Got the Beat won their first music show award on SBS' Inkigayo on January 30.

On December 29, 2022, it was announced that Got the Beat's first extended play Stamp on It would be released on January 16, 2023.

Members

 BoA
 Taeyeon 
 Hyoyeon 
 Seulgi 
 Wendy 
 Karina 
 Winter

Discography

Extended plays

Singles

Videography

Music videos

Other videos

Concerts

Concert participation

 SM Town Live 2022: SMCU Express at Kwangya (2022)
 SM Town Live 2022: SMCU Express (2022)
 SM Town Live 2023: SMCU Palace at Kwangya (2023)

Awards and nominations

Notes

References

BoA
Girls' Generation
Red Velvet (group)
Aespa
South Korean girl groups
K-pop music groups
South Korean dance music groups
Pop music supergroups
SM Entertainment artists
2022 establishments in South Korea
Musical groups established in 2022
Musical groups from Seoul